Leighton Road Cutting is a 0.6 hectare geological Site of Special Scientific Interest between East Cranmore and Cloford in Somerset, notified in 1984. It is a Geological Conservation Review site

Leighton Road Cutting provides exposure of a series of early Jurassic limestones, of Lower Lias age, which are the only known outcrops of these particular rocks to occur in a normal horizontally-bedded sequence in the Mendips. The discovery of the Leighton Road Cutting sections enabled geologists to understand how the fissure infills seen widely throughout the Mendips had been formed.

Sources
 English Nature citation sheet for the site (accessed 10 August 2006)

External links
 English Nature website (SSSI information)

Sites of Special Scientific Interest in Somerset
Sites of Special Scientific Interest notified in 1984
Road cuttings in the United Kingdom
Transport in Somerset
Geology of Somerset
Roads in Somerset